Mark 21 or Mk XXI or variation, may refer to:

 5"/38 MK 30, a variant of the 5-inch/38-caliber gun
 Beaufighter Mark 21, a variant of the Bristol Beaufighter
 Mk 21 (type 356), a variant of the Supermarine Spitfire (Griffon-powered variants)
 Freighter Mk 21, a variant of the Bristol Freighter
 Mk 21 Mod 0, a 7.62x51mm variant of the M1919 Browning machine gun
 Mk. 21 Airborne Interception radar
 Mark 21 nuclear bomb
 Mk 21 Precision Sniper Rifle (PSR), based on the Remington MSR
 MK 21 Mod 0 Scalable Offensive Hand Grenade